William Stairs is the name of:

William Grant Stairs (1863–1892), Canadian-British soldier and explorer of Africa
William James Stairs (1819–1906), Canadian merchant, banker, politician
William J. Stairs (born 1956), Canadian political consultant
William Machin Stairs (1789–1865), Canadian merchant, banker and statesman